Paul Berry (born 3 June 1976) is a  unionist politician in Northern Ireland who was a Member of the Legislative Assembly (MLA) for Newry and Armagh from 1998 to 2007. Elected as a  Democratic Unionist Party (DUP) candidate, Berry left the party in 2006 to sit as an Independent Unionist.

Early life
Berry was born in Craigavon, County Armagh, and brought up in Tandragee, where he was educated at local state schools and colleges, following which he was employed in the textile industry. He joined the Democratic Unionist Party (DUP) at the age of 16, the same age at which he began gospel singing in churches in the North Armagh and Banbridge areas.

Political career
With his high profile as a singer, Berry was elected, aged 22, the youngest MLA in the first Northern Ireland Assembly as a DUP representative for the Newry and Armagh constituency in the 1998 election and was re-elected in the 2003 election.

He was elected to Armagh City and District Council in 2001, and re-elected in the 2005 elections.

In the 2005 general election Berry was the DUP candidate for Newry and Armagh constituency.

Controversy
Just days before the election, the Sunday World newspaper claimed that Berry had met a man for a massage, with whom he had made initial contact via a gay chatroom, in a Belfast hotel room booked by Berry under a false name. Berry claimed that he was seeking treatment for a sports injury, and said he was considering legal action against the paper. He was not elected and was the only DUP candidate to experience a fall in their share of the vote in favour of the Ulster Unionist Party. 

Weeks later the DUP who, since 1977 have maintained a Christian fundamentalist stance on gay rights, and launched a campaign known as Save Ulster from Sodomy, suspended Berry from membership and commenced disciplinary proceedings.
Berry launched a legal challenge but in February 2006 dropped these proceedings and resigned from the party.

Post-controversy career
An active member of the Orange Order, Berry was on the traditionalist, fundamentalist wing of the DUP.  In the 2007 assembly election he stood as an Independent candidate, opposed to the DUP policy of implementing the St Andrews Agreement but failed to be elected.

Berry continues to perform as a gospel singer, and has released three compilations. 
He is married to Lorna and now works in Tandragee as a local estate agent.

In 2011 he was elected as an Independent Unionist candidate to Armagh City and District Council.

In 2019, Berry gained a seat as an independent unionist in the Armagh City, Banbridge and Craigavon Borough Council

References

1976 births
Living people
Democratic Unionist Party MLAs
Members of Armagh City and District Council
Independent members of the Northern Ireland Assembly
Northern Ireland MLAs 1998–2003
Northern Ireland MLAs 2003–2007
People from Craigavon, County Armagh
Gospel singers from Northern Ireland
Politicians from County Armagh
21st-century British singers
21st-century Irish singers
21st-century British male singers
Musicians from County Armagh